The Growing Up in New Zealand longitudinal study (GUiNZ) is New Zealand’s largest ongoing cohort study. It recruited and follows 6,846 New Zealand children born between 2009 and 2010—approximately 11 per cent of all children born in the country in that period. The project aims to create an in-depth summary of what life is like for children in New Zealand, and what factors affect their happiness, health, and development. The study also seeks to represent the diversity of modern-day New Zealand families, filling in current knowledge gaps on the health and wellbeing of Māori, Pasifika, and other communities. The study is run from the University of Auckland and is funded primarily by the New Zealand Government.

History  

The study was specifically designed to provide population-relevant and modern data on New Zealand’s children in the nation, which ranked 29th out of 30 OECD countries for child health as of 2009. The study was launched in 2008, directed by Dr Susan Morton. Recruitment of more than 6000 pregnant women from the Auckland and Waikato regions began in 2009.

Outcomes 
The study has revealed important information on many issues facing New Zealand children. This includes issues such as poverty, obesity, diet, ethnic differences in healthcare access, and antenatal and postpartum depression of parents.  

GUiNZ has led to key policy changes in areas such as immunisation, the Māori language, parental leave, nutrition, and household safety, improving the health and wellbeing of New Zealanders. In 2019, the Ministry of Business, Innovation and Employment awarded the study an Endeavour Fund grant. The project "Our generation, our voices, all our futures" was established to create new technological connections with the cohort and engage the broader public with the study.

See also 

 Dunedin Multidisciplinary Health and Development Study

References

External links 
 

Cohort studies
Children's health
Health in New Zealand
Research in New Zealand
University of Auckland